Erving Township is a township in Jewell County, Kansas, USA.  As of the 2000 census, its population was 60.

History
Erving Township was organized in 1872. It was named for one Dr. Erving, an early settler and native of Hiawatha.

Geography
Erving Township covers an area of 35.94 square miles (93.1 square kilometers); of this, 0.03 square miles (0.07 square kilometers) or 0.08 percent is water.

Adjacent townships
 Odessa Township (north)
 Ionia Township (northeast)
 Athens Township (east)
 Cawker Township, Mitchell County (south)
 Ross Township, Osborne County (southwest)
 Lincoln Township, Smith County (west)
 Webster Township, Smith County (northwest)

Cemeteries
The township contains two cemeteries: Reformed and Rooker.

References
 U.S. Board on Geographic Names (GNIS)
 United States Census Bureau cartographic boundary files

External links
 US-Counties.com
 City-Data.com

Townships in Jewell County, Kansas
Townships in Kansas